Sita Devi Yadav is a Nepalese politician, belonging to the Nepali Congress currently serving as the member of the 1st Federal Parliament of Nepal. In the 2017 Nepalese general election she was elected as a proportional representative from Madheshi category.

References

Nepal MPs 2017–2022
Living people
Nepali Congress politicians from Madhesh Province
Members of the 2nd Nepalese Constituent Assembly
1955 births